Ryan Agar and Adam Feeney were the defending champions, but did not compete this year.

Brydan Klein and Dane Propoggia won the title, defeating Jarmere Jenkins and Mitchell Krueger 6–1, 1–6, [10–3] in the final.

Seeds

Draw

Draw
{{16TeamBracket-Compact-Tennis3
| RD1=First round
| RD2=Quarterfinals
| RD3=Semifinals
| RD4=Final

| RD1-seed01=1
| RD1-team01= M Daniell A Sitak 
| RD1-score01-1=3
| RD1-score01-2=7
| RD1-score01-3=[18]
| RD1-seed02=
| RD1-team02= C Ti J Statham 
| RD1-score02-1=6
| RD1-score02-2=5
| RD1-score02-3=[20]

| RD1-seed03=
| RD1-team03= L-C Huang N Meister 
| RD1-score03-1=5
| RD1-score03-2=3
| RD1-score03-3=
| RD1-seed04=
| RD1-team04={{nowrap| Jake Eames C O'Connell}}
| RD1-score04-1=7| RD1-score04-2=6| RD1-score04-3=

| RD1-seed05=4
| RD1-team05= B Klahn M Reid
| RD1-score05-1=77| RD1-score05-2=66
| RD1-score05-3=[8]
| RD1-seed06=
| RD1-team06= J Jenkins M Krueger| RD1-score06-1=65
| RD1-score06-2=78| RD1-score06-3=[10]| RD1-seed07=WC
| RD1-team07= Mitchell Harper C Puttergill
| RD1-score07-1=5
| RD1-score07-2=4
| RD1-score07-3=
| RD1-seed08=
| RD1-team08= Maverick Harper Gavin van Peperzeel| RD1-score08-1=7| RD1-score08-2=6| RD1-score08-3=

| RD1-seed09=
| RD1-team09= D Wu T-H Yang
| RD1-score09-1=3
| RD1-score09-2=2
| RD1-score09-3=
| RD1-seed10=
| RD1-team10= A Hubble J-P Smith| RD1-score10-1=6| RD1-score10-2=6| RD1-score10-3=

| RD1-seed11=
| RD1-team11= B Klein D Propoggia| RD1-score11-1=6| RD1-score11-2=77| RD1-score11-3=
| RD1-seed12=3
| RD1-team12= M Gong H-Y Peng
| RD1-score12-1=2
| RD1-score12-2=65
| RD1-score12-3=

| RD1-seed13=WC
| RD1-team13= Daniel Hobart T Kokkinakis| RD1-score13-1=6| RD1-score13-2=77| RD1-score13-3=
| RD1-seed14=WC
| RD1-team14= Jarryd Chaplin J Thompson
| RD1-score14-1=2
| RD1-score14-2=65
| RD1-score14-3=

| RD1-seed15=
| RD1-team15= Bumpei Sato G Soeda
| RD1-score15-1=65
| RD1-score15-2=55
| RD1-score15-3=
| RD1-seed16=2
| RD1-team16= A Bolt A Whittington| RD1-score16-1=77| RD1-score16-2=77'''
| RD1-score16-3=

| RD2-seed01=
| RD2-team01= C Ti J Statham 
| RD2-score01-1=3
| RD2-score01-2=5
| RD2-score01-3=
| RD2-seed02=
| RD2-team02=

References
 Main Draw

Traralgon Challenger 1- Doubles
2014 Doubles
Latrobe City Traralgon Challenger 1- Doubles